Homosaces pelochares is a moth in the family Cosmopterigidae. It is found on Java.

The larvae feed on the leaves of Planchonia valida.

References

External links
Natural History Museum Lepidoptera generic names catalog

Cosmopterigidae
Moths described in 1934